Shrirampur  is a city and a municipal council located in the Ahmednagar district of the Indian state of Maharashtra situated at 19.62 N, 74.66 E in western Maharashtra

Climate

Shrirampur experiences three distinct seasons: Summer, Monsoon and Winter. The warmest months in Shrirampur are April and May, the city often receives locally developed heavy thundershowers in the month of May (although humidity remains high).

Demographics 
 India census, Shrirampur had a population of 89,282. Males constitute 51% of the population and females 49%.Shrirampur has an average literacy rate of 72%, higher than the national average of 59.5%: male literacy is 79%, and female literacy is 66%. In Shrirampur, 13% of the population is under 6 years of age. Shrirampur had sex ratio - 939

Electricity
The Mula Pravara Electric Co-operative Society Limited (MPECSL), Shrirampur was established in 1969, as one of the five pilot co-operative societies established in India as a rural electric co-operative Society. It used to distribute electricity in 183 villages spread over five talukas in the Ahmednagar district. Its consumer base was around 1.45 lakh consumers with sanctioned load of around 207 MW and MPECS receives power from Maharashtra.

Since 1977, it has defaulted on Maharashtra State Electricity Distribution Company Limited (MSEDCL)'s bills. It also refused to increase power tariff as directed by Maharashtra Electricity Regulatory Commission (MERC) in 2007. that resulted in dues to MSEDCL to staggering Rs 2300 crore. MERC has directed MPECS directors to hand over the entire power distribution system and associated assets, including offices, land, material and workshops to MSEDCL from zero hours on 1 February 2011. It can file an appeal before the commission to decide the transfer value of the assets. The society will also have to hand over all data in soft as well as hard format. It will also have to pay the security deposit amount collected from consumers.

Notable people 
The following are notable residents from Shrirampur:
 
 
 Annasaheb Shinde, agriculture minister for center
 Karamshi Jethabhai Somaiya

References 

 
Cities and towns in Ahmednagar district